Lance Henriksen (born May 5, 1940) is an American actor. He is known for his works in various science fiction, action and horror films, such as that of Bishop in the Alien film franchise, and Frank Black in Fox television series Millennium (1996–1999) and The X-Files (1999). He has also done extensive voice work, as Kerchak the gorilla in the 1999 Disney film Tarzan (1999), General Shepherd in Call of Duty: Modern Warfare 2 (2009) and Fleet Admiral Steven Hackett (as well as Narl) in BioWare's Mass Effect video game trilogy (2007–2012). He also appeared as Vukovich in The Terminator, Chains Cooper in Stone Cold, and starred as Ed Harley in the cult horror film Pumpkinhead (1988).

Early life 
Henriksen was born on May 5, 1940, in Manhattan, New York. His father, James Henriksen, was a Norwegian merchant sailor and boxer nicknamed "Icewater" who spent most of his life at sea, while his mother, Margueritte Werner, struggled to find work as a dance instructor, waitress and model. His parents divorced when he was two years old, and his mother struggled to raise him and his brother, leading to his spending part of his childhood in foster care. During an interview, Henriksen recounted how, at the age of seven, his mother handed him his birth certificate and said, "You'll always know who you are", then pushed him out of his home. Henriksen did not actually leave home until he was 12, saying he'd "had enough" of his home life, and that he had been physically assaulted by multiple family members: "I got bludgeoned a lot. Different people, relatives. I remember every single face from my childhood. My alcoholic uncles, whoever. I'm not having a pity party here; I'm not Quasimodo. That's just how it was".  On another occasion, two of his uncles tried to persuade him to take Methadrine and then take part in a staged car accident for the insurance money.

Growing up, Henriksen had a reputation for getting into trouble in the various schools he attended, and even spent time in a children's home. He left school after completing first grade, and was illiterate until the age of 30. He served in the United States Navy from 1955 to 1958 and attained the rank of petty officer third class.

Career 
Henriksen is a well accomplished actor who first found work as a muralist and as a laborer on ships. For a time, he worked in Europe. His first theater work, around age 30, was as set designer, and he received his first acting role because he built the set for a production. Illiterate until then, it was around this time that he taught himself to read. For his first role, he put the entire script to tape with the help of a friend, learning everyone's part in addition to his own. Soon afterward, he graduated from the Actors Studio and began acting in New York City.

Henriksen's first film appearance was in It Ain't Easy in 1972. It was followed by supporting roles in a variety of films, including Dog Day Afternoon (1975), Close Encounters of the Third Kind (1977), and Damien: Omen II (1978). He played Police Chief Steve Kimbrough in Piranha Part Two: The Spawning (1982), the astronaut Walter Schirra in The Right Stuff (1983), and actor Charles Bronson in the television film Reason for Living: The Jill Ireland Story (1991).

When James Cameron was writing The Terminator (1984), he originally envisioned Henriksen, with whom he had worked on Piranha II: The Spawning, playing the title role, a cyborg. The role ultimately went to Arnold Schwarzenegger. Henriksen does appear in the film in the supporting role of Vukovich, a member of the Los Angeles Police Department.

Henriksen played the android Bishop in Cameron's film Aliens (1986), and as Bishop's unnamed designer in Alien 3 (1992). He also played Charles Bishop Weyland, the man upon whom Bishop was based, in Alien vs. Predator (2004). He played the vampire leader Jesse Hooker in Kathryn Bigelow's cult film Near Dark.

He portrayed gunfighters in the Westerns Dead Man and The Quick and the Dead, and appeared with British actor Bruce Payne in Aurora: Operation Intercept in 1995. That year, he also played Sheriff Doug Barnum in the film Powder. He appeared with Payne again in Face the Evil (1997), and the dystopian classic Paranoia 1.0 (2004).

In 1996, Henriksen starred in the television series Millennium, created and produced by Chris Carter, the creator of The X-Files. Henriksen played Frank Black, a former FBI agent who possessed a unique ability to see into the minds of killers. Carter created the role specifically for the actor. His performances on Millennium earned him critical acclaim, a People's Choice Award nomination for Favorite New Male TV Star, and three consecutive Golden Globe nominations for Best Performance by an Actor in a TV Series (1997–1999). The series was cancelled in 1999. On television, Henriksen appeared in the ensemble of Into the West (2005), a miniseries executive-produced by Steven Spielberg. He appeared in a Brazilian soap opera, Caminhos do Coração (Ways of the Heart) from Rede Record, aired in 2007–2008. Henriksen guest-starred on a Season 6 episode of NCIS (2009) playing an Arizona sheriff, and appeared in a recurring role as The Major on NBC's The Blacklist.

In the years after Millennium, Henriksen has become an active voice actor, lending his distinctive voice to a number of animated features and video game titles. In Disney's Tarzan (1999) and its direct-to-video followup, he is Kerchak, the ape who serves as Tarzan's surrogate father. He provided the voice for the alien supervillain Brainiac in Superman: Brainiac Attacks (2006) and for the character Mulciber in Godkiller (2009). Henriksen is the voice of the character Molov in the video game Red Faction II (2002) and has also contributed to GUN (2005), Run Like Hell (2002), the canceled title Four Horsemen of the Apocalypse (2004), and the role-playing game Mass Effect (2007) as Admiral Hackett of the Human Systems Alliance. Henriksen was also the voice behind PlayStation 3's internet promotional videos.

In 2005, Henriksen was the voice of Andrei Rublev in Cartoon Network's IGPX. The actor lent his voice to the animated television series Transformers: Animated as the character Lockdown. In 2009, Henriksen voiced Lieutenant General Shepherd in the award-winning game Call of Duty: Modern Warfare 2. He would later voice Karl Bishop Weyland in Aliens vs. Predator; also, this character's appearance resembles Henriksen's. Henriksen voiced Master Gnost-Dural in Star Wars: The Old Republic, and he also reprised his role as Admiral Hackett in Mass Effect 3. He is also the narrator of the recent Verizon Droid commercials. Recently, Henriksen reprised his role as Bishop in Aliens: Colonial Marines.

Henriksen maintains a prominent role in live action television. He has starred in a 2003 series of Australian television commercials for Visa, titled Unexplained (about the raining of fish from the sky over Norfolk) and Big Cats (about the Beast of Bodmin Moor). In these commercials, Henriksen speaks as a Frank Black-type character about these phenomena as Mark Snow-inspired mysterious music plays in the background, as a link to Henriksen's TV series Millennium. Unexplained went on to a gold world medal at the 2004 New York Festivals.

In addition to his television and voice acting work, Henriksen continues to be active in film. He made a cameo appearance in the 2009 horror comedy Jennifer's Body, and starred in the After Dark Horrorfest film, Scream of the Banshee, released in 2011. He played Henry Gale in Leigh Scott's The Witches of Oz.

In January 2015, he was signed for the lead in the indie thriller Monday at 11:01 A.M. In 2016, he starred in the feature film Deserted, a psychological thriller. Henriksen played the role of Hopper.

In 2018, Henriksen performed motion capture and vocal performance for the character of Carl Manfred in the video game Detroit: Become Human. The game's plot involves androids gaining sentience and free will, topics explored briefly with Henriksen's Bishop character in Aliens.

In October 2018, Henriksen was signed for one of the two leads in Falling, the directorial debut of actor Viggo Mortensen, who also wrote, produced and co-starred. Reviewing the film's 2020 premiere, The Hollywood Reporters John DeFore noted not only the quality of Henriksen's performance, but the opportunity Mortensen's script presented: "[F]ew moviegoers who've enjoyed him over the years will be surprised, but many will resent that we, and he, have waited so long for a role like this."

He received a Canadian Screen Award nomination for Best Actor at the 9th Canadian Screen Awards in 2021, for his performance in Falling.

In 2022, Henriksen was cast in the upcoming American horror film, Awaken the Reaper. The film is currently shooting in New York and slated for a 2023 Release date. It is directed by Justin Paul and Dave Campfield and produced by Fourth Horizon Cinema, Impact Media Studios and Design Weapons.

Personal life 

Henriksen has been married three times. His current wife is Louise Lunde. He was married to Mary Jane Evans from 1985 to 1989 and to Jane Pollack from 1995 to 2006.

Henriksen has four children, including two sons with Lunde, Thiise and Lawrence Henriksen. Lawrence died in 1995. He has two grandsons Thiise Brok Henriksen and Trey Robert Bulleri. Though uncredited, his daughter Alcamy appears in an episode of the TV series Millennium. After Millennium ended its run, Henriksen moved to Hawaii with his then-wife Jane Pollack and their child Sage.

Art
Henriksen continues to produce art. He worked as a muralist before he became an actor, and he has worked with clay since 1960. In September 2017, Henriksen set up a   website to showcase and find homes for some of his most recent clay works. He "still believes that there is nothing as simple and beautiful as raw clay... And that Potters have the remaining soul of the nomads...always searching...."

Filmography

Film

Television

Video games

Books 
Autobiography
 Not Bad for a Human – The Life and Films of Lance Henriksen – Lance Henriksen with co-author Joseph Maddrey, published in 2011 by Bloody Pulp Books, featuring art by Bill Sienkiewicz, Mike Mignola, Tom Mandrake, Tim Bradstreet, Eric Powell and Ashley Wood.

Comic books
 To Hell You Ride (five-issue comic book from Dark Horse Comics) (2012) – Lance Henriksen and Joseph Maddrey (co-authors) with Tom Mandrake (artist); a motion-comic video was also made by Dark Horse Comics) (2012) – Lance Henriksen and Joseph Maddrey (co-authors), Tom Mandrake (artist), Lance Henriksen (narrator), TKU: Tecamachalco Underground (Cesar Gallegos/Mateo Latosa) (musical score)

Notes

References

External links 

 
 
 
 Lance Henriksen at FEARnet
 
 Lance Henriksen Magic
 Films in Review interview
 

1940 births
Living people
American male film actors
American male television actors
American male video game actors
American male voice actors
20th-century American male actors
21st-century American male actors
Male Western (genre) film actors
Male actors from New York City
United States Navy sailors
American people of Norwegian descent
American people of Scandinavian descent